Cyclocardia elegans is an extinct species of clam in the family Carditidae.

The specimen MNHN.F.J07579 was found at Parc de l'Institut national agronomique, in Thiverval-Grignon, Yvelines, France.

References 

 Cossmann M. and Pissarro G., 1905 - Iconographie complète des coquilles fossiles de l'Éocène des environs de Paris, t. 1
 Le Renard J.and Pacaud J.-M., 1995 - Révision des Mollusques paléogènes du Bassin de Paris. 2 - Liste des références primaires des espèces. Cossmanniana, t. 3, vol. 3, pages 65–132

External links 
 
  
 Cyclocardia elegans at Museum National d'Histoire Naturelle, Paris

Carditidae
Fossils of France
Yvelines
Bivalves described in 1806
Fossil taxa described in 1806
Eocene animals of Europe